Thaka Dhimi Tha Dancing Star (ತಕಧಿಮಿತ ಡಾನ್ಸಿಂಗ್ ಸ್ಟಾರ್) is a Kannada dance reality show broadcast by ETV Kannada in 2014. It is an adaptation of Colors TV's Jhalak Dikhhla Jaa. The show format is owned by BBC Worldwide. It features celebrities as contestants who are paired with professional dancers competing for a cash prize of 15 Lakhs. The judges are Guruprasad, Rakshita, and Yogesh. Akul Balaji is the host. The show premiered on 11 January 2014.

Grand finale was held at Innovative Film City and was broadcast on 4 May 2014. Tsunami Kitty and Disha Madan won the Dancing Star title for season one. The show was produced by Pixel Pictures Private Limited.

Contestants
A total of 12 celebrities, mostly TV actors, are coupled with dancing partners for the show.

Six out of twelve celebrities are associated with the broadcast channel in various programs. Apart from Rishi Kumara and Kumudha, all the celebrities do not have any prior experience in dancing.

Weekly summary

Weekly scores

The maximum points awarded for a couple is 30.

Danger Zone:  Irrespective of scores, couples can be subject to eviction based on the SMS votes.

Week 1:  The premiere week had no competition or scores. 
Week 7:  No points or scores were awarded for performances.
Week 9:  No elimination.
Week 11: Rishi & Tanusha were elimination, but re-entered again.
Week 12: No elimination.
Week 13: Quarter Finals and no elimination.
Week 14: Quarter Finals.
Week 15: Semi Finals.
Week 16: No performance.
Week 17: Finals.

Grand Finale: The performance of finalists were judged in two round with an additional guest judge (40 points)

 indicates the couple in danger zone who faced eviction.
 indicates that the couple withdrew.
 indicates no points.
 indicates did not perform.

Alternate names
MTS Dancing Star
MTS Takadhimitha
Takdhimita 
Thaka Dhimi Tha
Dancing Star
Taka Dimi Ta

References

External links
 YouTube Videos of Dancing Star
 HD photos of contestants participating in MTS Dancing Star
 Press Meet Photos
 Official YouTube Channel
 Dancing Star Contestants Introduction
 Promo/trailer of Thaka Dhimi Tha Dancing Star

Indian television series
Indian dance television shows
Dance competition television shows
Celebrity reality television series
Kannada-language television shows
Colors Kannada original programming